Julius H. Baggett (February 14, 1925 – September 18, 2019) was an American politician in the state of South Carolina. He served in the South Carolina House of Representatives as a member of the Democratic Party from 1967 to 1968 and from 1970 to 1974, representing McCormick County, South Carolina. He is a lawyer and retired Circuit Court judge. Baggett is an alumnus of Furman University and the University of South Carolina. He died at the age of 94 in 2019.

References

1925 births
2019 deaths
Democratic Party members of the South Carolina House of Representatives
Furman University alumni
University of South Carolina alumni
South Carolina lawyers
People from Florence, South Carolina
People from McCormick County, South Carolina
20th-century American lawyers